Bare is a suburb of and electoral ward in Morecambe, within the City of Lancaster district in Lancashire, England. The population of the ward as taken at the Census 2011 was 4,067.  Bare has a high street (Princes Crescent), and a railway station connecting it to Morecambe and Lancaster. Its name comes from Anglo-Saxon bearu meaning "grove".

Bare Hall is a Grade II listed building built around 1830 by the Lodge family

References

External links

 1953-1955 Ordnance Survey map showing Bare (on the north edge)

Populated places in Lancashire
Geography of the City of Lancaster
Seaside resorts in Lancashire
Morecambe
Morecambe Bay